Underskiddaw is a civil parish in the Borough of Allerdale in Cumbria, England.  It contains 21 listed buildings that are recorded in the National Heritage List for England.  Of these, one is listed at Grade II*, the middle of the three grades, and the others are at Grade II, the lowest grade.  The parish includes the settlements of Ormathwaite, Applethwaite, and Millbeck, and is otherwise rural.  Almost all the listed buildings are, or originated as, houses of various types, farmhouses or farm buildings.  Two of the buildings originated as mills, and one former country house has been converted into a hotel.  The other listed building is a village hall.


Key

Buildings

References

Citations

Sources

Lists of listed buildings in Cumbria